Yosniel Mesa Díaz (born 11 May 1981) is a Cuban retired football and futsal player.

Club career
Nicknamed Capi, Mesa played for his native provincial team Cienfuegos. After his defection he trained with Fort Lauderdale Strikers.

International career
Mesa played in the 2004 and 2008 FIFA Futsal World Cup tournaments representing Cuba in both.

He made his senior international debut for Cuba in a November 2010 Caribbean Cup qualification match against Grenada and has earned a total of 6 caps, scoring no goals. Later, he was involved in the 2010 Caribbean Cup tournament and made one appearance, as a substitute against Guadeloupe in the 83rd minute replacing Leonel Duarte.

He appeared with the Cuba national football team for the 2011 CONCACAF Gold Cup before defecting to the United States during the tournament.

Personal life

Defection to the United States
After losing to Mexico on 9 June 2011, Mesa left his Charlotte hotel at dawn through a fire escape and joined his uncle Julio (also a defector himself) who was waiting in his car outside the hotel. The pair then drove off to Julio's house in Miami.

References

External links
 

1981 births
Living people
Cuban footballers
Cuba international footballers
Association football forwards
FC Cienfuegos players
Defecting Cuban footballers
Defecting sportspeople of Cuba
2011 CONCACAF Gold Cup players
Cuban men's futsal players
People from Cienfuegos